Jerimoth Hill is the highest point in the U.S. state of Rhode Island. It is the lowest state highpoint in New England. Located in the town of Foster in the northwest of the state, the site is used as an observatory. It is also a popular destination for highpointers, and prior to 2005 was known for being difficult to access due to a local landowner who prohibited entry.

Location
The hill is located on Route 101 in Foster, a half mile from the Connecticut line.

History

The hill was named after Jerimoth Brown (17831830), an early settler.

The high point was donated to Brown University by Walter Raymond Turner, a Brown alumnus of the class of 1911. In 1938 he purchased the saltbox house to the west and the surrounding . Turner provided a right of way, straight north from the high point to Route 101, though eventually, it became overgrown.

Brown University has used Jerimoth Hill as an astronomy observatory location for decades, because the university has easy access to this land-locked parcel where they have a view of the skies without light pollution from Providence. The high point is a rocky outcrop in the woods on the northwest edge of the clearing. A summit register is located in a mailbox for visitors to sign.

As the highest point in Rhode Island, Jerimoth Hill is a destination for highpointers—hikers who try to reach the highest peak in various areas. For many years, hikers could not access the hill, because the only path to the summit crossed the driveway of a private property owner, Henry Richardson (aka "the madman of Jerimoth Hill"), who prohibited entry.  Richardson posted "no trespassing" signs and installed a security system that alerted him whenever people entered his property. Richardson's belligerence toward hikers made him something of a legend in the community. Eventually, Richardson's son worked out a plan to allow access to the path four times a year. After Richardson's death, his property was purchased in 2005 by the Mosley family, who permitted daily access and eventually ceded the land to the state. In 2014, Brown sold the summit itself to the state, though the university reserves the right to build an observatory there in the future.

See also

List of U.S. states by elevation

References

 

Brown University
Highest points of U.S. states
Hills of Rhode Island
Landforms of Providence County, Rhode Island
Foster, Rhode Island
,